Saint-Ouen is a station in Paris' express suburban rail system, the RER. It is situated in Saint-Ouen, in the département of Seine-Saint-Denis. The construction of the metro station permitted connections with the Paris Metro Line 14 at Saint-Ouen station

See also 
 List of stations of the Paris RER

External links 
 

Réseau Express Régional stations
Railway stations in France opened in 1988
Railway stations in Seine-Saint-Denis